Mark Waldo Zemansky (May 5, 1900 – December 29, 1981) was an American physicist. He was a professor of physics at the City College of New York for decades and is best known for co-authoring University Physics, an introductory physics textbook, with Francis Sears. The book, first published in 1949, is often referred to as "Sears and Zemansky", although Hugh Young became a coauthor in 1973.

Early life 
He grew up in Bensonhurst, Brooklyn where his mother, Bessie Cohen Zemansky (1868–1946), helped to found a Reform temple, and his father, Dr. Abraham Philip Zemansky (d. 1932), an 1874 graduate of the College of Physicians and Surgeons in the City of New York, was one of the first attending physicians at Lebanon Hospital located in The Bronx, New York (later merged as Bronx-Lebanon Hospital Center).

His twin brother, Abraham Philip Zemansky Jr. (Columbia University College of Physicians and Surgeons, '23), died in 1928 at age 28 of sepsis after a mastoid operation.

Academic career 
Zemansky graduated from City College of New York in 1921 and received a Ph.D. from Columbia University in 1927. His Ph.D. research and thesis was done under the supervision of Harold Worthington Webb (1884–1974)  and his thesis was entitled "The Diffusion of Imprisoned Resonance Radiation In Mercury Vapor". It was published in the journal Physical Review in 1927.

In 1925, he joined the faculty of City College of New York.

Zemansky was a National Research Council fellow, at Princeton University from 1928 to 1930, then at the Kaiser Wilhelm Institute in Berlin, Germany from 1930 to 1931. The research he did during that time was in radiation and collision processes of gaseous atoms.

In 1934, he co-authored with Allan C. G. Mitchell, son of the astronomer Samuel Alfred Mitchell, a seminal treatise entitled "Resonance Radiation and Excited Atoms". Nearly thirty years later, with enhanced interest in resonance phenomena set off by the invention of the laser and the discovery of the Mössbauer effect, the book would be reprinted in 1961.

In the early 1940s, he was involved in helping scientists get out of Germany and into the United States; in 1941, Zemansky and Rudolf Ladenburg helped Fritz Reiche and his family get out of Germany and into the United States securing them aid and academic positions.

From 1946 to 1956, he was associated with the Cryogenic Laboratory of Columbia University where he collaborated with Henry A. Boorse, an expert on low-temperature physics, on the measurement of heat capacities of superconducting metals and other researches. During this time he was involved in helping Chien-Shiung Wu to arrange for her groundbreaking experiment, in which the violation of parity conservation in weak interactions was established, to be carried out at the low-temperature laboratories of the National Bureau of Standards.

Zemansky taught for over four decades at the City College of New York until 1967 when he became a Professor Emeritus of Physics. As chairman of the physics department from 1956 to 1959, he brought it into the modern era. From 1963 to 1966 he was the first executive officer of the City University's new doctoral program in physics.

He was active in the American Association of Physics Teachers and was its president in 1951 and its executive secretary from 1967 to 1970.

Death 
He died at his home in Teaneck, New Jersey on December 29, 1981, of leukemia complications, and was survived by his wife Adele and son Herbert.

Personal life 
Zemansky, his wife Adele, and their family resided in Teaneck, New Jersey until the time of his death. They had two sons, Philip Zeman (1939–1979), and Herbert Zeman (b. 1943), a physicist and inventor of medical devices who graduated from Oberlin College in 1965 (A.B. Physics) then Stanford University in 1972 (M.S., Ph.D. Physics).

Awards
 1956 — Oersted Medal of the American Association of Physics Teachers

Selected books 
 Mitchell, Allan C. G.; Zemansky, Mark W. (1934). Resonance Radiation and Excited Atoms, Cambridge [Eng.] University Press
 Zemansky, Mark W. (1937). Heat and Thermodynamics: an Intermediate Textbook for Students of Physics, Chemistry, and Engineering New York : McGraw-Hill Publishing Company.
 Zemansky, Mark W. and Dittman, Richard. (1997). Heat and Thermodynamics: an Intermediate Textbook (edition: 7). McGraw-Hill.
 Sears, Francis; Zemansky, Mark. (1947–1948). College Physics, 2 volumes, Cambridge, Mass. : Addison-Wesley Press
 
 Zemansky, Mark W. (1964). Temperatures Very Low and Very High. Princeton, N.J., Published for the Commission on College Physics by D. Van Nostrand Company Inc. (reprinted by Dover Publications Inc., New York, NY, in 1981) (alternative copy of entire book online - Internet Archive)

See also 
 Herbert Callen

References

Sources
 Hofstadter, Robert; Lustig, Harry; Semat, Henry, "Obituary: Mark W. Zemansky", Phys. Today 35(3), 73 (1982); doi: 10.1063/1.2914982

Further reading 
 Nierenberg, William Aaron; Aaserud, Finn (interviewer), "Interview of William Aaron Nierenberg by Finn Aaserud on February 6, 1986", Niels Bohr Library & Archives, American Institute of Physics, College Park, MD USA. Zemansky is mentioned many times by Nierenberg in this interview.

External links 
 Photos of Mark Zamansky - The Emilio Segrè Visual Archives, part of the Niels Bohr Library & Archives at the American Institute of Physics.

1900 births
1981 deaths
20th-century American physicists
Columbia University Vagelos College of Physicians and Surgeons alumni
City College of New York alumni
City College of New York faculty
American male non-fiction writers
American textbook writers
Jewish American physicists
American twins
20th-century American male writers
20th-century American non-fiction writers
20th-century American Jews
Fellows of the American Physical Society